FBC Ostrava (FBC ČPP Bystroň Group Ostrava after its sponsors) is a floorball team based in Ostrava, Czech Republic. The team was founded in 1993.

The men's team have played in the highest Czech floorball league, Superliga florbalu, since its foundation in 1993. The team ended on the second place nine times, in the seasons 1993–94 through 1995–96, 1998–99, 2002–03 through 2005–06, and the last time in the season 2010–11. That makes it the fifth most successful Czech men team and the third team in number of participations in finals.

Women's team also play the highest Czech floorball league, Extraliga žen ve florbale, since the season 2013–14. Previously it played the highest league also in the seasons 2007–08 through 2011–12. The team has won a title in the season 2021–22, the fifth Czech women team to achieve that.

References

External links
 Official website 
 Club profile 

Czech floorball teams
Sport in Ostrava